Soft rot  may refer to:
 Pichia heedii, the soft rot of the cacti Lophocereus schottii and Drosophila pachea
 Sclerotium cepivorum (soft rot of onions)
 Erwinia sp. (bacterial soft rot)
 Soft rot (wood decay), a type of wood decay.